Hirgana or Hirgan is a village in Karkal taluk, Karkala, Udupi district.  the 2011 Census of India, it had a population of 5,019 people across 1,128 households.

References

Villages in Udupi district